Baird is a ghost town in Douglas County, Washington, United States. Baird is part of ZIP code 99115 and is home to the Highland Cemetery (also occasionally known as the Baird Cemetery). Baird appears on a 1909 map of Douglas County.

A post office called Baird was established in 1896, and remained in operation until 1934. James Baird, an early postmaster, gave the town his name.

References

Geography of Douglas County, Washington
Ghost towns in Washington (state)